The 2002 Clipsal 500 was the fourth running of the Adelaide 500 race. Racing was held from Friday 15 March until Sunday 17 March 2002. The race was held for V8 Supercars and was the opening round of the 2002 V8 Supercar Championship Series.

Format
The format, unique to V8 Supercar and loosely similar to the Pukekohe 500 format, splits the 500 kilometres into two separate 250 kilometres races each held on a different day. Points were assigned separately to the races, with more points allocated for Race 2 over Race 1, and they combined to award a round result.

Official results

Top fifteen shootout

Leg 1

Leg 2

Round results

Statistics
 Provisional Position - #1 Mark Skaife - 1:22.1273
 Pole Position - #1 Mark Skaife - 1:22.7698
 Fastest Lap - #1 Mark Skaife - 1:23.7200 (new lap record)

External links
 Official race results
 Official V8 Supercar website

References

Adelaide 500
Clipsal 500
2000s in Adelaide